Kittur Chennamma (23 October 1778 – 21 February 1829) was the Indian Queen of Kittur, a former princely state in present-day Karnataka. She led an armed resistance against the British East India Company in 1824, in defiance of the Paramountcy, in an attempt to retain control over her dominion. She defeated the Company in the first revolt, but died as a prisoner of war after the second rebellion. As one of the first and few female rulers to lead rebel forces against British colonisation, she continues to be remembered as a folk hero in Karnataka, she is also an important symbol of the Indian independence movement.

Early life
Kittur Chennamma was born on 23 October 1778, in Kakati, a small village in the present Belagavi District of Karnataka, India. She belonged to the Lingayat Panchamasaali community and received training in horse riding, sword fighting and archery from a young age. She married Raja Mallasarja of the Desai family at the age of 15.

Rebellion against the British
Chennamma's husband died in 1816, leaving her with a son and a state full of volatility. This was followed by her son's death in 1824.  Rani Chennamma was left with the state of Kittur and an uphill task to maintain its independence from the British. Following the death of her husband and son, Rani Chennamma adopted Shivalingappa in the year 1824 and made him  heir to the throne. This irked the East India Company, who ordered Shivalingappa's expulsion. The state of Kittur came under the administration of Dharwad collectorate in charge of St John Thackeray of which Mr Chaplin was the commissioner, both of whom did not recognise the new rule of the regent, and notified Kittur to accept the British control.

This is seen as a foreshadowing of the later Doctrine of lapse introduced by Lord Dalhousie, Governor General of India, to annex independent Indian States from 1848, a doctrine based on the idea that in case the ruler of an independent state died childless, the right of ruling the State reverted or "lapsed" to the suzerain.

Rani Chennamma sent a letter to Mountstuart Elphinstone, Lieutenant-Governor of the Bombay province pleading her case, but the request was turned down, and war broke out. The British placed a group of sentries around the treasury and crown jewels of Kittur, valued at around 1.5 million rupees upon the outbreak of war in order to protect them. They also mustered a force of 20,797 men and 437 guns, mainly from the third troop of Madras Native Horse Artillery in order to fight the war. In the first round of war, during October 1824, British forces lost heavily and St John Thackeray, collector and political agent, was killed in the war. Amatur Balappa, a lieutenant of Chennamma, was mainly responsible for his killing and losses to British forces. Two British officers, Sir Walter Elliot and Mr Stevenson  were also taken as hostages. Rani Chennamma released them with an understanding with Chaplin that the war would be terminated but Chaplin continued the war with more forces. During the second assault, subcollector of Solapur, Munro, nephew of Thomas Munro was killed. Rani Chennamma fought fiercely with the aid of her deputy, Sangolli Rayanna, but was ultimately captured and imprisoned at Bailhongal Fort, where she died on 21 February 1829. Chennamma was also helped by Gurusiddappa in the war against British.

Sangolli Rayanna continued the guerrilla war to 1829, in vain, until  his capture. Rani chennamma died due to health deterioration (But folklore says she died after knowing the news of Rayanna's capture by swallowing ring's diamond as she gave up the hope)  Rayanna wanted to install the adopted boy Shivalingappa as the ruler of Kittur, but Sangolli Rayanna was caught and hanged. Shivalingappa was arrested by the British. Chennamma's legacy and first victory are still commemorated in Kittur, during the Kittur Utsava held on  every year.

Books
 Khare Khare Kitturu Bandaya by M. M. Kalburgi. 
 Kitturu Samsthana Sahitya - Part III by M. M. Kalburgi and Part I, Part  II by others. 
 Kitturu Samsthana Dakhalegalu by A.B.Vaggar. 
 Kitturu Rani Chennamma by Sangamesh Tammanagoudar

Memorials

Burial place
Rani Chennamma's samadhi or burial place is in Bailhongal.

Statues
Parliament House, New Delhi

On 11September 2007 a statue of Rani Chennamma was unveiled at the Indian Parliament Complex by Pratibha Patil, the first woman President of India. On the occasion, Prime Minister Manmohan Singh, Home Minister Shivraj Patil, Lok Sabha speaker Somnath Chatterjee, BJP leader L. K. Advani, Karnataka Chief Minister H. D. Kumaraswamy and others were present, marking the importance of the function. The statue was donated by Kittur Rani Chennamma Memorial Committee and sculpted by Vijay Gaur.
Others
There are also statues commemorating her at Bengaluru, Belagavi, Kittur and Hubballi.

In popular culture

 The heroics of Kittur Rani Chennamma are sung by folk in the form of ballads, lavani and GiGi pada.
 Kittur Chennamma is a 1961 film in Kannada, directed by B. R. Panthulu with B. Saroja Devi in the title role.
 A commemorative postage stamp was released on 23 October 1977 by Government of India.
Coast guard ship "Kittur Chennamma" was commissioned in 1983 and decommissioned in 2011.
 The Indian Railways train Rani Chennamma Express connecting Bangalore and Miraj is named after her.
 Raiganj University Professor Pinaki Roy's essay "Alternative History: A Postcolonial Rereading of Naikar’s The Queen of Kittur", published in the Indian Journal of Multidisciplinary Academic Research (ISSN 2347-9884), 1(2), August 2014: 105–15, offers several instances of critical references to literary representations of the Queen of Kittur.
 Rani Channamma University in Belagavi is named in her honour.
 Kittur Chennamma is the name of a Martian vessel in the "Reload" episode of the science fiction series The Expanse.
 Remembered in RRR movie Etthara Jenda song alongside Tanguturi Prakasam , V. O. Chidambaram Pillai, Kerala Varma Pazhassi Raja , Sardar Vallabhbhai Patel, Bhagat Singh, Shivaji Maharaj, and Subash Chandra Bose

References

External links
Paintings of Kittur Rani Chennamma
Karnataka Goddess of Courage: Kittur Rani Chennamma (an article) by S. Srikanta Sastri

1778 births
1829 deaths
Indian women in war
Women in 19th-century warfare
Hindu monarchs
Indian female royalty
Kannada people
Lingayatism
History of Karnataka
People from Belagavi district
Resistance to the British Empire
Indian rebels
Indian queen consorts
18th-century Indian women
18th-century Indian people
19th-century Indian women
19th-century Indian people
Regents of India